Helga Tawil-Souri (born in Kuwait in 1969) is a Palestinian-American Associate Professor of Media, Culture, and Communication, an Associate Professor of Middle East and Islamic Studies and a Director of Graduate Studies New York University Steinhardt. Her work focuses on technology, media, culture, territory and politics, with a focus on Palestine and Israel.

She has also produced a number of documentary films. Tawil-Souri

Tawil-Souri holds a BA from McGill University (1992), an MA from the University of Southern California’s Annenberg School for Communication (1994), and a PhD from the School of Journalism and Mass Communication at the University of Colorado, Boulder (2005).

Career
Her documentary, "Not Going There, Don’t Belong Here", was completed in 2002 and filmed in November 2001 in various refugee camps in Lebanon. The film has aired on Free Speech TV, various public broadcasting channels in the U.S., at universities and film festivals in the U.S. and abroad.
 
"i.so.chro.nism: [twenty-four hours in jabaa]" was filmed in the Palestinian West Bank village of Jabaa and completed in 2004. The filmmaker considers it an experimental documentary film that juxtaposes the sounds and images of war and violence with traditional culture, filmed in the West Bank during the Second Intifada.

Tawil-Souri's research has focused on Americanization of the Palestinian Territories through Internet development. One of her book chapters was adapted into a seminar on information society and multiculturalism at Yeungnam University.
She was noted in a review of another book chapter for challenging some of the traditional theoretical assumptions in discussions of global communications. Her addressing of controversial issues about politics and video games has been the subject of discussion in the media.

Tawil-Souri is on the Editorial Board of the Middle East Journal of Culture and Communication, an academic peer reviewed journal published by Brill.

Tawil-Souri was an invited speaker at the 2nd Annual Social Good Summit along with Desmond Tutu, Elie Wiesel, Ted Turner, Lance Armstrong, Geena Davis and Mary Robinson. The Summit was sponsored by Mashable and the United Nations Foundation, held at the 92nd Street Y in New York City in September, 2011 and brought together global leaders to discuss the most challenging problems facing humanity.

Articles
Where is the Political in Cultural Studies? In Palestine, International Journal of Cultural Studies 16(1): 1-16, 2011.
Colored Identity: The Politics and Materiality of ID Cards in Palestine/Israel, Social Text 107: 67-97, 2011.
The Hi-Tech Enclosure of Gaza, In Mahrene Larudee (ed.), Gaza: Out of the Margins (30-52), 2011.
Walking Nicosia, Imagining Jerusalem, Re-Public 4, 2010.
Qalandia Checkpoint as Space and Non-Place, Space and Culture 14(1): 4-26, 2011.
Towards a Palestinian Cultural Studies, Middle East Journal of Communication and Culture 2(2): 181-185, Fall 2009.
New Palestinian Centers: An Ethnography of the ‘Checkpoint Economy', International Journal of Cultural Studies 12(3): 217-235, 2009.
The Political Battlefield of Pro-Arab Videogames on Palestinian Streets, Comparative Studies of South Asia, Africa, and the Middle East 27(3): 536-551, Fall 2007.
Global and Local Forces for a Nation-State Yet to Be Born: The Paradoxes of Palestinian Television Policies, Westminster Papers in Communication and Culture 4(3): 4-25, September 2007.
Marginalizing Palestinian Development: Lessons Against Peace, Development 49(2): 75-80, March 2006.
Coming Into Being and Flowing Into Exile: History and Trends in Palestinian Film-Making, Nebula 2(2): 113-140, June 2005.

Documentary films
 i.so.chro.nism: [twenty-four hours in jabaa]
 Not Going There, Don’t Belong Here

External links
Steinhardt faculty website
Faculty profile
helga.com

References

McGill University alumni
USC Annenberg School for Communication and Journalism alumni
University of Colorado Boulder alumni
New York University faculty
1969 births
Living people
Palestinian academics
Palestinian film directors
Palestinian women film directors
American people of Palestinian descent
Palestinian documentary film directors
21st-century Palestinian women writers
20th-century Palestinian women writers
Women documentary filmmakers